Muovi antaa periksi (1995) is the second album by the Finnish rock group Absoluuttinen Nollapiste.

Track listing
 "1900-luvun heleys" (Tommi Liimatta) – 3:15
 "Saatteeksi" (Liimatta) – 2:27
 "Ei, en ole rouva Bell" (Liimatta) – 3:17
 "Joku unohti piirtää jalan" (Liimatta) – 1:17
 "Kaikki metallit" (Aki Lääkkölä, Aake Otsala, Tomi Krutsin) – 1:20
 "Jälkivaatimus" (Liimatta, Otsala) – 4:01
 "Vuoto nieluun" (Liimatta) – 2:11
 "Viisas lintu (haukka)" (Liimatta) – 2:50
 "Älkääs nyt, äläs nyt" (Liimatta) – 0:49
 "Liittymä" (Liimatta) – 2:32
 "Olen pahoillani" (Lääkkölä) – 3:51
 "Suojasivu" (Liimatta) – 2:42
 "Savu meihin" (Liimatta, Lääkkölä) – 3:41
 "Korkuinen muovikauris" (Liimatta) – 2:08
 "Torin laita" (Liimatta) – 2:35
 "Kankaalle" (Liimatta) – 2:07
 "Kuvitus kirjoittajan" (Liimatta) – 1:06
 "Liian lämpimät asunnot" (Liimatta) – 2:01
 "Koira haistaa pelon" (Liimatta) – 3:50
 "Öljy puulle" (Liimatta) – 5:05
 "Sivulla jatkuu" (Liimatta) – 3:21
 "Nollapisteen juuret" (Liimatta) – 1:38
 "Yli 1000 erilaista kasvia" (Liimatta) – 6:17

Personnel
 Tommi Liimatta - vocals, wind instruments
 Aki Lääkkölä - guitars, keyboards
 Aake Otsala - bass guitar
 Tomi Krutsin - drums, brass instrument

External links
  
  Album entry at band's official website

Absoluuttinen Nollapiste albums
1995 albums